The Bippolo Seed and Other Lost Stories is a collection of seven illustrated stories by children's author Dr. Seuss published by Random House on September 27, 2011. Though they were originally published in magazines in the early 1950s, they had never been published in book form and are quite rare, described by the publisher as "the literary equivalent of buried treasure". The stories were discovered by Charles D. Cohen, a Massachusetts dentist and a Seuss scholar and biographer, who also wrote an introduction to the collection.

Plots
The seven stories included in the book are:
 "The Bippolo Seed" (60th-anniversary edition): a young duck named McKluck finds a rare seed that can grant wishes, but when a big cat tells him to wish for more than he needs to get money, they end up losing the seed in the process.
 "The Rabbit, the Bear, and the Zinniga-Zanniga": a rabbit escapes being eaten by convincing a bear that he has a rare but serious disorder: the lack of a single eyelash.
 "Gustav, the Goldfish": a boy overfeeds a goldfish named Gustav, causing him to grow until he fills a cellar. It was adapted in 1961 by Helen Palmer as A Fish out of Water.
 "Tadd and Todd": A boy named Tadd is depressed because no one tell him apart from his identical twin brother, Todd, so he tries to be different by enhancing his appearance, but all his attempts are foiled by Todd, who likes being like "two peas in a pod". In the end, Todd finally gets Tadd to accept the fact that they will always be the same and Tadd starts to enjoy being an identical twin.
 "Steak for Supper": a boy brags to himself about his steak dinner, causing a lot of strange beasts who hear the statement to follow him home for some steak. Later, it turns out that the boy's family got stew instead and all the creatures leave in disgust, much to the boy's relief. 
 "The Strange Shirt Spot": a boy gets dirt on himself, to his mother's dismay, so he tries to get it off but fails every time. 
 "The Great Henry McBride": a boy named Henry McBride dreams of having five jobs, all at once.

Publication
The collection was published by Random House on September 27, 2011. The stories originally appeared in magazines in 1950 and 1951. Dr. Seuss died in 1991, and the stories were later rediscovered by Charles D. Cohen, a Massachusetts dentist and Seuss scholar. Cathy Goldsmith of Random House encountered the magazine stories in one of Cohen's eBay auctions, around 2001. Random House published Cohen's book The Seuss, the Whole Seuss and Nothing But the Seuss: A Visual Biography of Theodor Seuss Geisel in 2003. He also contributed an introduction to this collection.

Analysis 
Some elements of the stories in this collection appeared in later books. The story "Gustav the Goldfish" was the basis for the Beginner Book A Fish out of Water. The book was written by Seuss's first wife Helen Palmer Geisel, illustrated by P. D. Eastman, and published in 1961. "Gustav the Goldfish" rhymes, unlike A Fish out of Water. Seuss later reused the basic plot of "The Strange Shirt Spot" for 1958's The Cat in the Hat Comes Back. In both stories, a character tries to remove a spot from various household items but only manages to transfer the spot to one object after another.

The story "The Rabbit, the Bear, and the Zinniga-Zanniga" was recorded by Marvin Miller and released on the 1965 album Dr. Seuss presents..."Fox in Socks" and "Green Eggs & Ham" on RCA Records.

References

Sources
 

2011 short story collections
Books by Dr. Seuss
Books published posthumously
American picture books
2011 children's books
Children's short story collections
Random House books
Goldfish in culture